"Just Like Me" is a 1965 single by Paul Revere & the Raiders featuring Mark Lindsay as vocalist. It was released on Columbia Records and marked the beginning of a string of garage rock classics.  As their second major national hit, "Just Like Me" reached #11 on the US charts and was one of the first rock records, due to guitarist Drake Levin, to feature a distinctive, double-tracked guitar solo.

Background
The tune was written by Rick Dey and Rich Brown of the Longview-based band, The Wilde Knights. Raiders manager Roger Hart paid them $5,000 for the use of the song.

Chart performance

Cover versions
Pat Benatar on her 1981 album Precious Time.
The Circle Jerks on Wild in the Streets, their 1982 album.

References

External links

1965 singles
Paul Revere & the Raiders songs
1965 songs
Columbia Records singles